The 1975–76 Athenian League season was the 53rd in the history of Athenian League. The league consisted of 32 teams.

Division One

The division featured two new teams, promoted from last season's Division Two: 
 Egham Town  (1st)
 Addlestone  (2nd)

League table

Division Two

The division featured 5 new teams:
 1 relegated from last season's Division One:
 Eastbourne United  (18th)
 4 joined the division:
 Camberley Town, from Spartan League
 Harefield United, from Spartan League
 Epsom & Ewell, from Surrey Senior League
 Tring Town, from Spartan League

League table

References 

Athenian League
Athenian_League_1975-76